Finavia Oyj, formerly the Finnish Civil Aviation Administration, is the public limited company responsible for maintaining and developing Finland's airport network. Finavia manages and develops 20 airports around the country, 18 of which primarily serve commercial flights and 2 of which focus solely on military and general aviation. Finavia is owned by the Finnish Government.

Finavia's headquarters are located on the grounds of Helsinki Airport. Kimmo Mäki started as Finavia's CEO January 1, 2018. The Prime Minister's Office is responsible for Finavia's ownership steering and oversight.

In 2019, 26 million passengers used Finavia's airports, with Helsinki Airport, Finavia's main airport, constituting 21.9 million of those. Helsinki Airport is an important transfer hub in Northern Europe, especially for Asian transfer passengers.

Operations 

Finavia's customers are airlines, other operators in the sector, as well as passengers. Finavia's main business units are Helsinki Airport and the airport network in Finland. Finavia's daughter companies are Lentoasemakiinteistöt Oyj, a real estate company and Airpro Oy, a company providing ground services for airports and airlines.

Finavia's main services for airlines and passengers are:
 Airports: airport services, maintenance of runways and terminals, ramp handling and security check services.
 Real estate operations (through Lentoasemakiinteistöt Oyj): Leasing commercial premises at the airports and in their vicinity.
 Ground services and security check services for air traffic (through Airpro Oy).

Finavia used to also take care of Finland's air navigation, which was separated as its own business for Air Navigation Services Finland in the beginning of April, 2017

Network 

The airport network supported and developed by Finavia is composed of 20 airports in Finland. Finavia's largest civilian airport by number of passengers is Helsinki Airport (18.9 million passengers in 2017).

Finavia maintains 20 airports in Finland:
 Helsinki Airport
 Oulu Airport
 Rovaniemi Airport
 Turku Airport
 Vaasa Airport
 Kittilä Airport
 Tampere Airport
 Kuopio Airport
 Ivalo Airport
 Joensuu Airport
 Jyväskylä Airport
 Kajaani Airport
 Kokkola-Pietarsaari Airport
 Mariehamn Airport
 Savonlinna Airport
 Pori Airport
 Kemi-Tornio Airport
 Kuusamo Airport
 Halli Airport
 Utti Airport

Snow removal 

Finavia's airports are recognized for their snow removal capacity and expertise on dealing with harsh snow conditions at airports. Finavia invests especially in the 24/7 availability of winter weather and airfield maintenance. The unusually large snowfalls in the winter of 2010–2011 in Europe brought chaos to many airports in Central Europe, with many airports shutting down temporarily. Despite these snowfalls, Finavia's airports remained operational throughout the entire winter. Finavia and Helsinki Airport's snow removal abilities have also been recognized by other European airport operators.

Use of artificial intelligence 
Finavia has also been recognized for the use of artificial intelligence and data in its airports. Finavia has partnered with the Finnish technology company Reaktor to use passenger data and machine to make the airport customer experience smoother and ease rush. Their innovation has been proven to reduce flight delays by 61 percent. The use of AI at Helsinki Airport was named one of the Top 10 transportation innovations of 2018 by Monocle magazine.

See also 

 List of the largest airports in the Nordic countries

References

External links 

 Official website

Airport operators
Transport companies of Finland
Air navigation service providers
1991 establishments in Finland